Ilse Clara Franziska Ipsen is a German-American mathematician who works as a professor of mathematics at North Carolina State University. She was formerly associate director of the Statistical and Applied Mathematical Sciences Institute, a joint venture of North Carolina State and other nearby universities.

Education and career
Ipsen earned a diploma from the Kaiserslautern University of Technology in 1977, and completed her doctorate from the Pennsylvania State University in 1983 under the supervision of Don Heller. Her dissertation was Systolic Arrays for VLSI and concerned Very Large Scale Integration hardware implementations of the systolic array parallel computing architecture.

After working at Yale University for ten years beginning in 1983, she joined North Carolina State University in 1993.

Ipsen is Founding Editor in Chief of the SIAM Book Series on Data Science.

Book
Ipsen is the author of the book Numerical Matrix Analysis: Linear Systems and Least Squares (SIAM, 2009), an introductory graduate textbook on the sensitivity analysis of computations in linear algebra.

Recognition
In 2011, she became a fellow of the Society for Industrial and Applied Mathematics "for contributions to numerical linear algebra, perturbation theory, and applications." She was elected as a fellow of the American Association for the Advancement of Science in 2018.

References

External links
Home page

Year of birth missing (living people)
Living people
20th-century German mathematicians
20th-century American mathematicians
21st-century American mathematicians
American women mathematicians
Technical University of Kaiserslautern alumni
Pennsylvania State University alumni
Yale University faculty
North Carolina State University faculty
Fellows of the Society for Industrial and Applied Mathematics
Fellows of the American Association for the Advancement of Science
20th-century women mathematicians
21st-century women mathematicians
20th-century American women
21st-century American women